Laget Church is a parish church of the Church of Norway in Tvedestrand Municipality in Agder county, Norway. It is located in the village of Laget. It is one of the churches for the Holt parish which is part of the Aust-Nedenes prosti (deanery) in the Diocese of Agder og Telemark. The white, wooden church was built in a long church design in 1908 using plans drawn up by the architect Henrik Nissen. The church seats about 250 people.

The church was first built in 1908 as a chapel of ease for the northern part of the Holt Church parish. The church was consecrated on 11 September 1908. In 1967, the roof and tower were repaired.

See also
List of churches in Agder og Telemark

References

Tvedestrand
Churches in Agder
Wooden churches in Norway
20th-century Church of Norway church buildings
Churches completed in 1908
1908 establishments in Norway